Babičko is a village in the municipality of Leskovac, Serbia. It is also the location of Babičko Monastery. According to the 2002 census, the village has a population of 515 people.

References

Populated places in Jablanica District